This is a list of events in Scottish television from 2018.

Events

January
No events.

February
No events.

March
No events.

April
April – Students are able to enrol for the new National Film and Television School in Scotland.
1 April – 50th anniversary of the first edition of the BBC's Reporting Scotland.

May
16 May – STV announces that the STV2 local television network is to close at the end of the following month. and that it had sold the channel's assets to That's Media, owners of the That's TV network of local television stations in England.

June
30 June – 
STV2 closes down and the channel's assets are sold to That's Media, owners of the That's TV network of local television stations in England.
The closure of STV2 results in the cancellation of STV News Tonight.

July
 No events.

August
No events.

September
 7 September – The Edinburgh edition of STV News at Six ends and is replaced on the 10th by shorter opt-outs within a Central Scotland programme.

October
15 October – That's TV Scotland launches as the replacement local television service in Aberdeen, Ayr, Dundee, Edinburgh and Glasgow.

November
No events.

December
No events.

Debuts

Cbeebies
 12 November – Molly and Mack (2018–2022)

Television series
Reporting Scotland (1968–1983; 1984–present)
Sportscene (1975–present)
Landward (1976–present)
The Beechgrove Garden (1978–present)
Eòrpa (1993–present)
Only an Excuse? (1993–2020)
River City (2002–present)
The Adventure Show (2005–present)
Daybreak Scotland (2007–present)
An Là (2008–present)
Trusadh (2008–present)
STV Rugby (2009–2010; 2011–present)
STV News at Six (2009–present)
The Nightshift (2010–present)
Scotland Tonight (2011–present)
Shetland (2013–present)
Scot Squad (2014–present)
Still Game (2002–2007; 2016–2019)
Two Doors Down (2016–present)

See also
2018 in Scotland

References

 
Television in Scotland by year
2010s in Scottish television